Sappy is the second Japanese extended play and the  by South Korean girl group Red Velvet. It was released by Avex Trax on May 29, 2019. The EP features six tracks, including their previously released singles "Sappy", "Sayonara", and the Japanese version of "Power Up".

Release 
Sappy was released in two physical editions: a CD-only first-press limited edition and a CD+DVD regular edition. It was also released as a digital download.

Commercial performance 
The EP debuted at number four on the Oricon Albums Chart in its first week with 14,769 physical copies sold. It also debuted at number 4 on Billboard Japan's Hot Albums. The EP also charted at number 61 on Billboard Japans Top Download Albums and at number 4 on Top Albums Sales with 16,140 estimated copies sold.

Track listing

Charts

References 

2019 EPs
Avex Group EPs
Japanese-language EPs
Red Velvet (group) EPs